The Adriatic LNG terminal is a liquid natural gas offshore terminal, formally known as Terminale GNL Adriatico Srl. The terminal is operated by ExxonMobil (70%), Qatar Terminal Ltd., a subsidiary of QatarEnergy (23%),  and Snam (7%).

Construction 
The terminal facility was built in Campamento, parish of San Roque, Spain, then towed to Porto Levante, Italy. Construction started in October 2003 and finished in August 2008.  The LNG tanks "rings" were constructed in South Korea and they were assembled in Spain. The pipeline that connects to the terminal is located south of the Levante Po River mouth near Scanno Cavallari.

Moving 
After construction was completed in Campamento, the rig was towed by four tugboats to its current location off the coast of Rovigo. When it arrived, the terminal was weighted down by water to ensure it was permanently positioned on the seabed.

Operations 
Operations started in the mid of 2009.  It received its first cargo on 11 August 2009.  When fully operational, it stores and regasifies  of natural gas per year, enough to meet 10% of Italy's natural gas needs.  The terminal receives a LNG carrier every three days from Qatar. The gas is then regasified and  sent to the Italian gas network by a pipeline from the terminal to the coast.

References 

Liquefied natural gas terminals
Energy infrastructure in Italy
Natural gas in Italy